The Karāpiro Power Station is a hydroelectric power station at Karapiro on the Waikato River, in the North Island of New Zealand. The power station lies on Lake Karapiro, a major rowing regatta venue. It is the last of the eight hydroelectric power stations on the Waikato River.

Karāpiro is a baseload power station, as it is required to maintain water flow in the lower Waikato River even during low inflows to the catchment and during low electricity demand. Only two turbines are required to keep the river flow at a reasonable level, with the third turbine being available for peak generation and during maintenance on either of the other turbines.

Like all of the hydroelectric power stations on the Waikato River, Karāpiro is operated by  electricity generator Mercury Energy.

History
Karāpiro was the second power station built in the Waikato hydro scheme, after Arapuni. Construction of the dam and power station began in 1940, but a materials and labour shortage due to World War II meant progress was slow. The station was completed in 1947, four years behind schedule.

The creation of Lake Karapiro behind the dam flooded the Horahora Power Station, the first power station built on the Waikato River.

The first generator was commissioned on 10 April 1947, just six days after Horahora was flooded. However, problems with the guide bearing meant full generation didn't start until 21 April 1947. The second generator was commissioned on 21 September 1947. In the first 12 months (to 31 March 1948), the station produced 349,568 megawatt-hours of electricity, just over 20 percent of the North Island's electricity requirements.

The third and final generator was commissioned in May 1948.

The bridge over the spillway is the only road access to the turbine hall. The first bridge had a supporting column in the center of the bridge. The bridge was destroyed by the water running through the spillway in a significant flood event (Source: Mighty River Photo archives). The replacement bridge is as you see today with no supporting column.

To the left of the four spillway gates are three siphon tubes. These were designed for the management of the lake level under normal river flow and the spillway gates were to be used in only extreme conditions. The design of the siphon tubes was faulty: The flow of water was supposed to be stopped by a blast of air, but this never worked properly - resulting in the spillway gates to be used for lake level control.

Generation

Karāpiro's powerhouse is located on the northern bank of the river, with a diversion tunnel and spillway also on the northern bank. The river is dammed by a concrete arch dam south of the powerhouse, with the electricity substation on the southern bank of the river.

Water from Lake Karapiro runs through the penstocks to three Kaplan turbines. Each turbine turns a generator, outputting 32 megawatts of electricity each at 11,000 volts. Around  of water every second is required to run through the turbines to generate 1 MW of electricity.

Karāpiro is controlled remotely by Mercury Energy's Waikato River control room in Hamilton.

Transmission
As part of the power station's construction, a 110,000-volt double-circuit line was built from the station to Hamilton substation. The line was commissioned on 29 March 1947. This line remains in service today as the main connection from Karāpiro to the rest of the national grid. In addition, 110,000-volt single-circuit lines connect Karāpiro with Te Awamutu and Hinuera substations. All the lines are now owned and operated by national grid operator Transpower.

See also

Electricity sector in New Zealand
List of power stations in New Zealand

References

Further reading

External links
 

Energy infrastructure completed in 1948
Hydroelectric power stations in New Zealand
Waikato River
Buildings and structures in Waikato
1940s architecture in New Zealand
Waipa District